Prince Edmund may refer to:

Edmund of Langley, 1st Duke of York (1341–1402), the fifth son of Edward III of England
Edmund Tudor, Duke of Somerset, son of Henry VII of England and Elizabeth of York
Prince Edmund Batthyany-Strattmann (1826–1914), a Hungarian nobleman 
in fiction
Prince Edmund (Blackadder) (1461- 1498), the name of the main character in the first series of the British sitcom Blackadder

See also
 King Edmund (disambiguation)

Edmund